Oricola is a comune and town in the province of L'Aquila, Abruzzo, central  Italy, located near the regional boundary with Latium. It is commanded by a mid-15th century rocca (fortress) and, in its communal territory, is home to the remains of several ancient Italic settlements. The church of Santa Restituta contains a 13th-century fresco.

References

 
Marsica